The Nanjangud banana, natively called as Nanjangud rasabalehannu, is a variety of banana grown in and around the area Mysore district and Chamarajanagar district of Karnataka, India. It is famous for its unique taste and aroma. It was found that the black clay alluvial saline soil found in and around Nanjangud drastically changed the taste and aroma, giving it a particular geographical identity, so it is now registered under geographical indicators under Government of India.

Uniqueness
The Nanjangud banana is said to have a unique taste and aroma due to the black clay alluvial saline soil found in and around Nanjangud and the unique method of organic cultivation. It was found that if it is grown in other places, the banana would develop hard lump and lose its aroma. The uniqueness in its trait is being attributed to its genetic make up.

Cultivation and requirement
The Nanjangud banana is a tropical plant and is restricted to the region of 30N to 30S of latitude. A dry and humid climate is said to be the best condition for its growth.

Geographical Indication
The Department for Horticulture under the government of Karnataka proposed the registration of the Nanjangud banana under the Geographical Indications of Goods Act, 1999, to the Office of the Controller-General of Patents, Designs and Trademarks, Chennai, in order to give  the farmers of Mysore the right to exclusively brand their products as Nanjanagud bananas. It was granted the Geographical Indication status three years later, in 2005.

See also
 Coorg orange
  Bangalore Blue
 Byadagi chilli
  Udupi Mattu Gulla
 Coorg Green Cardamom
 List of Geographical Indications in India
 Mysore
 Nanjangud
 Chamarajanagar

References

Banana cultivars
Mysore district
Geographical indications in Karnataka